William Russell Roesch (born July 1865) was the first mayor of Eau Gallie, Florida. He served six-terms in 1896, 1901, 1905, 1908, 1924, and 1925. He was the founder and editor of the newspaper The Eau Gallie Record. He also served as postmaster.

Roesch, was the first town treasurer of Eau Gallie in 1887.

In 1913, President Woodrow Wilson appointed Roesch postmaster of Eau Gallie, and reappointed him in 1918. In 1921, he was reappointed by President Warren Harding. Roesch was also member of the local volunteer fire department.

He founded The Eau Gallie Record in 1916. He turned over the day-to-day operations of the newspaper to his son, William Phillip Roesch, when he became Eau Gallie's mayor. The Roesch family sold the Record in 1925 when both William R. Roesch's wife and his son's wife died within weeks of each other that year.

See also 
 Roesch House - a frame vernacular style house built in about 1901. In 1945, the house was bought by one of William Rosseter's daughters, Caroline, who donated it in 1992 to the Florida Historical Society. It was made the society's state headquarters.

References 

1865 births
American newspaper editors
American people of German descent
Mayors of Melbourne, Florida
People from Wisconsin
Florida postmasters
Year of death unknown
People from Eau Gallie, Florida